William Morgan Griffiths (24 March 1896 – 11 October 1970) was an Australian rules footballer who played with St Kilda in the Victorian Football League (VFL).

Family
The son of Thomas Philip Griffiths (1855-1905), and Ellen Griffiths (1854-1940), née Ashcroft, William Morgan Griffiths was born at Kangaroo Flat on 24 March 1896.

He married Lola Westlake (1901-1988) on 8 June 1925. They had three children: Frank Griffiths (1927-1988), William Thomas Griffiths (1928-2014), and Maxwell James Griffiths (1929-2017).

Football
Having played several games with the St Kilda Second XVIII, he played in his only senior game, on the half-forward flank, in St Kilda's last home-and-away match for the 1919 season, against Fitzroy, at the Junction Oval, on 6 September 1919.

Military service
Griffiths served in the Australian Army in both World War I and World War II.

Later life, and death
He later lived in Canberra, and then in Kiama, New South Wales. He died in Kiama on 11 October 1970).

Notes

References
 
 
 First World War Embarkation Roll: Sapper William Morgan Griffiths (1814), collection of the Australian War Memorial.
 First World War Nominal Roll: Lance Sergeant William Morgan Griffiths (1814), collection of the Australian War Memorial.
 First World War Service Record: Lance Sergeant William Morgan Griffiths (1814), National Archives of Australia.
 Second World War Nominal Roll: Sergeant William Morgan Griffiths (N104312), Department of Veterans' Affairs.

External links 

1896 births
1970 deaths
Australian rules footballers from Victoria (Australia)
St Kilda Football Club players